Garuk Dam is a proposed dam located on Garuk River, 47 km south east of Kharan District in Balochistan, Pakistan. The dam is an earth core rockfilled dam with a height of 184 feet. The reservoir when completed will irrigate a command area of 12,500 Acres and will have hydro-power capacity of 300 KW.

See also
List of dams and reservoirs in Pakistan
List of power stations in Pakistan

Notes

Dams in Balochistan, Pakistan